Austin Daniel Hendrick (born June 15, 2001) is an American professional baseball outfielder in the Cincinnati Reds organization. Hendrick was selected 12th overall by the Reds in the 2020 Major League Baseball draft.

Amateur career
Hendrick grew up in Pittsburgh, Pennsylvania and attended West Allegheny Senior High School, where he was both an outfielder and a starting pitcher on the baseball team. Regarded as one of the best collegiate recruits in his class early on, he committed to play college baseball at Mississippi State after his freshman year of high school when he batted .371 with three home runs, 20 RBIs and 17 walks and went 5-0 with 37 strikeouts in 34 innings as a pitcher. He batted .327 with a .519 on-base percentage and 12 RBIs, two doubles, two triples and two home runs with 23 walks in 79 plate appearances in his junior season. After the season, Hendrick played for the United States national baseball team in the 2019 World Baseball Softball Confederation U-18 Baseball World Cup in Gijang, South Korea. He also played in the Under Armour All-America Game and won the event's home run derby as well as the MLB High School Home Run Derby.

Professional career
Hendrick was considered one of the top high school prospects for the 2020 Major League Baseball draft, and was selected 12th overall by the Cincinnati Reds. Hendrick signed with the Reds for a $4 million bonus.

After not playing a minor league game in 2020 due to the cancellation of the season, Hendrick was added to Cincinnati's 60-man player pool with whom he train at Prasco Park. He made his professional debut with the Daytona Tortugas of the Low-A Southeast, slashing .211/.380/.388 with seven home runs, 29 RBIs and 16 doubles over 63 games. He struck out 100 times and walked 51 times over 209 at-bats. He missed time during the season due to groin and wrist injuries.

References

External links

USA Baseball profile

2001 births
Living people
Baseball outfielders
Baseball players from Pennsylvania
Sportspeople from the Pittsburgh metropolitan area
United States national baseball team players
Daytona Tortugas players
Dayton Dragons players